Correa eburnea, commonly known as the Deep Creek correa, is a species of shrub that is endemic to the Fleurieu Peninsula in South Australia. It has papery, elliptic to egg-shaped leaves, and up to five green, nodding flowers arranged in leaf axils.

Description
The stamens protrude from the end of the corolla.

Taxonomy
Correa eburnea was first formally described by Paul G. Wilson in 1998 in the botanic journal  Nuytsia from plant material collected in 1991 from Deep Creek Conservation Park on the Fleurieu Peninsula by Robert John Bates.

Distribution and habitat
Deep Creek correa occurs near Encounter Bay where it grows on the banks of damp creeks and on cliff tops near the mouths of major creeks on the southern Fleurieu Peninsula. Most individuals are in the Deep Creek Conservation Park.

Conservation status
This correa is listed as a "endangered" under the Australian Government Environment Protection and Biodiversity Conservation Act 1999 and the South Australian Government National Parks and Wildlife Act, 1972. The main threats to the species are vegetation clearing and grazing by cattle.

References

eburnea
Flora of South Australia
Taxa named by Paul G. Wilson
Plants described in 1998